Wuhan Yaqi Football Club was a Chinese football club its based in Wuhan, Hubei province, China. After a disappointing 2006 China League Two season, it was disbanded in April 2007.

Name history
1996–1998 Anhui Lepusheng F.C. 安徽乐普生
1999–2007 Wuhan Yaqi F.C. 武汉雅琪

Results
As of the end of 2006 season

All-time League Rankings

 in group stage

References

Defunct football clubs in China
Football clubs in China
Sport in Wuhan
2007 disestablishments in China
Association football clubs disestablished in 2007